Historically, English rugby league clubs competed for the Lancashire Cup and the Yorkshire Cup, known collectively as the county cups. The leading rugby clubs in Yorkshire had played in a cup competition (affectionately known as t’owd tin pot) for several years prior to the schism of 1895. However, the Lancashire authorities had refused to sanction a similar tournament, fearing it would lead to professionalism.

After the split, the replacement for the Yorkshire Cup was not immediately introduced; however, new Yorkshire and Lancashire Cups were introduced in the 1905–06 season.

The county cups were played on the same basis as the Challenge Cup, with an open draw and straight knock-out matches leading to a final.

The county cups were abandoned in 1993 due to the more successful clubs complaining about overloaded fixtures, but the Yorkshire Cup was revived in 2019.

Yorkshire Cup 

The Yorkshire Cup is a rugby league county cup competition for teams in Yorkshire. Starting in 1905 the competition ran, with the exception of 1915 to 1918, until the 1992–93 season, when it folded due to fixture congestion. In 2019, the competition was revived along with a new trophy.

The competition was open to all senior member clubs of the Rugby Football League in Yorkshire and was normally played in the opening months of the season.  On two occasions, 1918–19 and 1940–41 the competition was held towards the end of the season due to the two world wars.  During the Second World War the Lancashire Cup was not played for between 1941 and 1945 and several Lancashire clubs were admitted into the Yorkshire Cup competition instead.  The cup finals in 1942, 1943 and 1944 were played over two legs with the winner being determined by aggregate score over the two matches. From 2019, the competition did not include Super League clubs.

Between 1966 and 1993 a trophy, called the White Rose Trophy, was awarded to the man of the match in each final.  The judging was conducted by members of the press.

Finals

Wins by club 
Includes the historic pre-2019 competition wins only.

Lancashire Cup 

The Lancashire Cup was founded in 1905 and was an annual cup competition for teams in and around Lancashire. There was no competition between 1941 and 1945 because of World War II. The last edition of the cup was in 1992–93 after that it folded due to there being too many fixtures in the calendar.

Finals 

The Lancashire Cup was not played during the Second World War (1940–45). During this period the Yorkshire Cup finals of 1942, 1943, and 1944 were played over two legs, with aggregate score being used.

 After extra time; full-time score was 9–8 meaning scores were tied 13–13 on aggregate

Wins by club

TV coverage 
The BBC regularly televised both the Lancashire and Yorkshire Cup finals from 1958-59 to 1984–85 usually as part of the Grandstand programme but after 1984–85 the BBC dropped the county cups from its Rugby League coverage due to cutbacks. But from 1987-88 to 1990–91 both the Lancashire and Yorkshire Cup finals were televised by ITV in their respective regions. In 1987–88, 1988–89, 1989–90 and 1990–91 Yorkshire Television through their Scrumdown programme with live coverage. The Lancashire Cup final was televised by Granada in 1989–90 and 1990–91 under the Rugby League Live name again with live coverage. The 1991–92 Lancashire and Yorkshire Cup finals were both shown by British Aerospace Sportscast the Yorkshire Cup Final was live but the Lancashire Cup Final was recorded and shown on the Monday Night. But the last finals in 1992–93 were not shown on TV. The 1985–86 and 1986–87 Yorkshire Cup finals and the Lancashire Cup finals in 1985–86, 1986–87, 1987–88 and 1988–89 also had no TV coverage. The 1965–66 and 1968–69 Lancashire Cup finals were played on a Friday night and likely to have been recorded by the BBC and shown on Grandstand the following day.

References 

Rugby league competitions in the United Kingdom
Rugby league in Lancashire
   
RFL Lancashire Cup
RFL Yorkshire Cup